Chimes of Freedom may refer to:
Chimes of Freedom (song), a 1964 song written by Bob Dylan
Chimes of Freedom (EP), a 1988 live Bruce Springsteen EP
Chimes of Freedom: The Politics of Bob Dylan's Art, a 2003 book about Bob Dylan by Mike Marqusee 
Chimes of Freedom (album), a 2012 album compiling covers of Bob Dylan songs
 Chimes of Freedom (horse)